In mathematics, specifically in algebraic topology, the Eilenberg–Zilber theorem is an important result in establishing the link between the homology groups of a product space  and those of the spaces  and . The theorem first appeared in a 1953 paper in the American Journal of Mathematics by Samuel Eilenberg and Joseph A. Zilber.  One possible route to a proof is the acyclic model theorem.

Statement of the theorem
The theorem can be formulated as follows. (The argument applies equally to the simplicial or singular chain complexes.) We also have the tensor product complex , whose differential is, by definition, 

Then the theorem says that we have chain maps

Consequently the two complexes must have the same homology:

Statement in terms of composite maps

The original theorem was proven in terms of acyclic models but more mileage was gotten in a phrasing by Eilenberg and Mac Lane using explicit maps. The standard map  they produce is traditionally referred to as the Alexander–Whitney map and  the Eilenberg–Zilber map.

This is what would come to be known as a contraction or a homotopy retract datum.

The coproduct

With respect to these coproducts on 

,

also called the Eilenberg–Zilber map, becomes a map of differential graded coalgebras. The composite  itself is not a map of coalgebras.

Statement in cohomology

The Alexander–Whitney and Eilenberg–Zilber maps dualize (over any choice of commutative coefficient ring  with unity) to a pair of maps

which are also homotopy equivalences, as witnessed by the duals of the preceding equations, using the dual homotopy . This  induces an isomorphism in cohomology, so one does have the zig-zag of differential graded algebra maps 

Replacing  with  so the maps all go the same way, one gets the standard cup product on cochains, given explicitly by 

,

which, since cochain evaluation  vanishes unless , reduces to the more familiar expression.

Note that if this direct map  of cochain complexes were in fact a map of differential graded algebras, then the cup product would make  a commutative graded algebra, which it is not. This failure of the Alexander–Whitney map to be a coalgebra map is an example the unavailability of commutative cochain-level models for cohomology over fields of nonzero characteristic, and thus is in a way responsible for much of the subtlety and complication in stable homotopy theory.

Generalizations

An important generalisation to the non-abelian case using crossed complexes is given in the paper by Andrew Tonks below. This give full details of a result on the (simplicial) classifying space of a crossed complex stated but not proved in the paper by Ronald Brown and Philip J. Higgins on classifying spaces.

Consequences
In light of the Eilenberg–Zilber theorem, the content of the Künneth theorem consists in analysing how the homology of the tensor product complex relates to the homologies of the factors.

See also 
 Acyclic model

References
.
.
.
.

Homological algebra
Theorems in algebraic topology